Marcourt is a French surname. Notable people with the surname include:

Antoine Marcourt, 16th-century French Protestant pastor
Jean-Claude Marcourt (born 1956), Belgian politician

French-language surnames